The Boston Building, built in 1890, is a historic building in Denver, Colorado. It was designed by the firm Andrews, Jaques & Rantoulthe same architects who designed the nearby Equitable Buildingand was dubbed the first "strictly modern office building" in Denver at time of its construction. Standing 9 stories tall (35 meters high), the building is located at 828 17th Street in Denver's historic district, on the corner of E. 17th St. and Champa. In 1978 the Boston Building received National Historic Landmark status under the Historic Resources of Downtown Denver Multiple Property Submission (Building Number: 5DV.108). The building has also been deemed a Denver historic landmark. In 1998, the building was renovated and joined with the Kistler Building to create one and two-bedroom apartment lofts.  It is now also known as Bank Lofts.

Boston Lofts

Today, the Boston Building is located in the heart of downtown Denver next to LoDo and the 16th Street Mall. It is surrounded by other National Historic Landmark buildings, such as the US National/Guaranty Bank Building (which has been converted to the Bank Lofts), the American National Bank Building, and the Denver National Bank Building. It houses 158 residential apartment lofts, which have retained some of the character of the original building (including high ceilings, exposed brick, pressed-tin ceilings, and original stained glass windows on the 2nd floor). Its exterior features a combination of Renaissance Revival and Richardsonian Romanesque style elements and is clad in Manitou red sandstone. The original building had vaults in the corners of the building, which have been converted into vestibules for the corner apartment units. Some units have even retained the heavy vault doors on the outer vestibule. The property was purchased by Apartment Investment and Management Company (Aimco – stock ticker AIV) in 2000 from National Properties.

Green Initiatives

Prior to 2008, the Boston Lofts purchased steam from Denver's central steam plant to provide domestic water heating and space heating. In 2008, the steam heating system was replaced with high efficiency, condensing boilers fueled by clean burning natural gas. The new system includes a web enabled building control system to maximize the operating efficiency of the new central plant. The retrofit conversion reduced the amount of energy required to fulfill the heating demands compared to the city steam system and also eliminated approximately 300,000 gallons of waste water per year.

Tenants

In addition to the apartment lofts, the building also houses  of retail spaces - which is currently occupied by Cobbler's Corner, Gourmet Deli, Tousled Hair, D'Vine Wine, and FASTSIGNS.

Gallery

References

External links

 Tousled Hair
 Dvine Wine
 FASTSIGNS
 Aimco
 Boston Lofts
 Aimco apartments

Colorado State Register of Historic Properties
Residential buildings in Denver
Denver landmarks
National Register of Historic Places in Denver
Commercial buildings on the National Register of Historic Places in Colorado
Renaissance Revival architecture in Colorado
Buildings and structures completed in 1890